Nyana is a double disc album by trance producer and DJ Tiësto, released on May 6, 2003. Disc one is labeled Outdoor, while the second CD is labeled Indoor.

According to the FAQ section on Tiësto's official website: "On a visit in South Africa, Tiësto was introduced to a cheetah named Nyana". In Swahili "nyana" means sunrise.

Track listing

 Note: Track 1 of Disc 1 of the CD release is mis-labeled as "M. Mayer – Love Is Stronger Than Pride".

References

2003 compilation albums
Tiësto compilation albums
Black Hole Recordings albums